Edward Laemmle (October 25, 1887 – April 2, 1937) was an American film director of the silent era. He directed more than 60 films between 1920 and 1935.

Biography
Edward Laemmle was born in Chicago, Illinois and died in Los Angeles. He was the nephew of Carl Laemmle, founder of Universal Studios. His half sister was Carla Laemmle, dancer and actress and his brother was director Ernst Laemmle. He married Peppi Heller on April 8, 1923; the couple had two girls, Constance and Carlotta, and settled in Beverly Hills, California.

Selected filmography

 Shipwrecked Among Cannibals (1920)
 Cinders (1920)
 The Two-Fisted Lover (1920)
 Superstition (1920)
 The Man with the Punch (1920)
 The Saddle King (1921)
 Sweet Revenge (1921)
 Winners of the West (1921)
 Top o' the Morning (1922)
 In the Days of Buffalo Bill (1922)
 The Victor (1923)
 The Oregon Trail (1923)
 The Man in Blue (1925)
 Spook Ranch (1925)
The Whole Town's Talking (1926)
 The Still Alarm (1926)
Held by the Law (1927)
Man, Woman and Wife (1929)
The Drake Case (1929)

References

External links

1887 births
1937 deaths
People from Chicago
Film directors from Illinois
American film directors